The Grand Canyon Antelopes baseball team represents Grand Canyon University, which is located in Phoenix, Arizona. The Antelopes, also known as the Lopes, are an NCAA Division I college baseball program that competes in the Western Athletic Conference. They competed in Division I from 1991 to 1998, the final four seasons with the Western Athletic Conference, and returned in 2014 with the WAC.

The Grand Canyon Antelopes play all home games on campus at Brazell Field at GCU Ballpark. Over their 16 discontinuous seasons in the Western Athletic Conference, GCU has won five WAC regular-season titles including four of the last five fully-completed seasons.

Since the program's inception in 1953, 10 Lopes have gone on to play in Major League Baseball, highlighted by 1993 AL Rookie of the Year and 2002 World Series champion Tim Salmon.

Conference membership history (Division I only) 
1991–1994: Independent
1995–1998: Western Athletic Conference
2014–present: Western Athletic Conference

Brazell Field at GCU Ballpark 

Brazell Field at GCU Ballpark is a baseball stadium on the Grand Canyon campus in Phoenix, Arizona that seats 4,000 people. It was opened on February 16, 2018 with a 2–1 loss to TCU. A record attendance of 5,261 was set on February 18, 2022, an opening day loss to Nevada.

Head coaches (Division I only) 
<small>Records taken from the 2020 GCU baseball media guide.

Year-by-year NCAA Division I results
Records taken from the 2020 GCU baseball media guide.

Awards and honors (Division I only)

 Over their 11 discontinuous seasons in the Western Athletic Conference, 18 different Lopes have been named to the all-conference first-team.

Freshman All-Americans

Western Athletic Conference Player of the Year

Western Athletic Conference Pitcher of the Year

Western Athletic Conference Coach of the Year

Western Athletic Conference Freshman of the Year

Taken from the 2020 GCU baseball media guide. Updated March 2, 2020.

Lopes in the Major Leagues

Taken from the 2020 GCU baseball media guide. Updated March 2, 2020.

See also
List of NCAA Division I baseball programs

References